Lijia is a town in Anyue County, Sichuan province, China. , it administers the following six residential communities and 14 villages:
Tuanjie Community
Wangjiaba Community
Gaowu Community
Heping Community
Dongfeng Community
Xianfeng Community
Daoliu Village
Zhonggou Village
Shuangshi Village
Motan Village
Gufo Village
Longshi Village
Guanyan Village
Gongping Village
Zhengfang Village
Jiama Village
Dawu Village
Sujiaqiao Village
Longwang Village
Rutang Village

References

Township-level divisions of Sichuan
Anyue County